The Afton Independent School District or Afton Public Schools is a school district based in Afton, Oklahoma (United States).

It includes the communities of Afton and Narcissa in Ottawa County, a section of Bernice in Delaware County, and a section of Craig County.

See also
List of school districts in Oklahoma

References

External links
 Afton Independent School District homepage
 Afton Overview

School districts in Oklahoma
Education in Ottawa County, Oklahoma
Education in Craig County, Oklahoma
Education in Delaware County, Oklahoma
Government agencies with year of establishment missing